Odoardo Fialetti (18 July 1573 – 1638?) was an Italian painter and printmaker who began his training during the late Renaissance, and showed distinct mannerist sensibilities in his mid-career, adopting a much looser and more dynamic style in his later life.

Born in Bologna, he initially apprenticed with Giovanni Battista Cremonini, and after traveling to Rome, he moved to Venice to work in the elderly Tintoretto's studio. From 1604 to 1612, he is listed as member of the Venetian Fraglia dei Pittori. In Venice, he painted a St Agnes for the church of San Nicolò da Tolentino and scenes from the Life of St Dominic for  the sacristy of the Santi Giovanni e Paolo.  He died in Venice.

References

 Grove Art Encyclopedia entry on Artnet

External links

Jusepe de Ribera, 1591-1652, a full text exhibition catalog from The Metropolitan Museum of Art, which includes material on Odoardo Fialetti (see index)
Tutte le parti del corpo hvmano diuiso in piu pezzi (The True Method and Order to Draw All Parts and Limbs of the Human Body) - a 1608 anatomical method book by Fialetti for drawing human body parts

1573 births
1638 deaths
Artists from Bologna
16th-century Italian painters
Italian male painters
17th-century Italian painters
Italian Renaissance painters
Mannerist painters
Painters from Venice